Yerrobana Palle (also known as Yerraobana Palli) is a village in the town of Darsi in the Prakasam district of Andhra Pradesh, India.

External links 
 https://www.facebook.com/yerraobanapalliYSRCP/

References 

Villages in Prakasam district